To Grow With Love (Traditional Chinese: 肥田囍事) is a TVB modern drama series broadcast in October 2006. The series is shown to celebrate TVB's 39th Anniversary.

Myolie Wu gained a reported 50 pounds to play her role of Tina Ho Mei-Tin and Jack Wu gained 40 pounds to play his role of Lam Koon-Hei.

Synopsis
Tina Ho Me-Tin (Myolie Wu) is an overweight woman who is determined to find her soulmate. Tina wants to find someone who thinks the same way she does and whom she can communicate with. She placed yellow hand prints under a painting of the sun setting, if that ONE man knew those handprints were a Sunflower; he's her soulmate. She flees to Hong Kong to get away from her frustrating father. There, she meets up with her cousin, Maggie Kwok Bo-Lok (Selena Li).

Tina meets a fashion designer named Daniel Dai Hei (Andy Hui). She works for his company D-Day but her designs are horrible. At first Daniel hates Tina, but he learns to accept her a little bit after seeing how much she has to struggle in Hong Kong. She has helped him quite a bit also, emotionally.

Upon the decision of firing her due to her lack of designing skills, Daniel begins treating her much nicer. However, Tina uses him to trick her father. On a misunderstanding everyone thought Tina had lost her virginity to her boss, her father traveled all the way to Hong Kong.  With the help of her land lady (Gigi Wong), they devise a meeting between Tina's father and Daniel.  With verbal interruptions, they prevented either of them from discovering the truth, temporarily.

Tina's father, however, sees Daniel with his actual girlfriend - whom he introduced - and decides to take action against her daughters 'two-timing boyfriend'.  One thing leads to the next and Daniel, comprehending what had happened, becomes very angry. Daniel's girlfriend, Rachel Sung Ma-Yee (Claire Yiu), finds out what happened and takes it the wrong way. However, Daniel fires Tina and insults her harshly, then tells Rachel that he has nothing to do with her. Tina is very upset and goes back home in the Philippines.

When Rachel goes to Philippines for a business trip, Daniel wants to give her a surprise and goes to visit her. He goes to a jewelry shop to buy a Rachel a present where he meets Tina's fiancé, Mak Ka-Fai (Kenneth Ma). While talking, they both get hit by a car. Tina's fiancé falls into a coma, while Daniel loses his memory. Tina decides to use this to her advantage and get revenge on Daniel for all the awful things he has done to her. First, she decides to fatten him up (because she knows how much he hates fat people), and then makes him fall in love with her. She plans to break up with him and break his heart. However, Tina found herself falling for him too!

Cast

Viewership ratings

Accolades

References

External links
 TVB.com To Grow with Love - Official Website 

TVB dramas
2006 Hong Kong television series debuts
2006 Hong Kong television series endings